David Berger (born March 30, 1950) is a Canadian lawyer, politician, diplomat, and sports executive.
 
He was born in Ottawa, Ontario, the eldest son of Sam Berger. He attended Ashbury College before receiving a Bachelor of Arts degree in 1971 from the University of Toronto and a Bachelor of Civil Law in 1975 from McGill University. From 1975 to 1979, he was an Executive Vice-president for the Montreal Alouettes Football Club. From 1978 to 1979, he was President of the Canadian Football League. He was elected to the House of Commons of Canada for the riding of Laurier in the 1979 federal election. A Liberal, he was re-elected four more times in 1980, 1984, 1988, and 1993 (in the riding of Saint-Henri—Westmount). In 1982, he was the Parliamentary Secretary to the Minister of State (Small Businesses and Tourism). From 1982 to 1984, he was the Parliamentary Secretary to the Minister of Consumer and Corporate Affairs. He resigned in 1994 after being appointed the Canadian ambassador to Israel and was at the same time High Commissioner of Canada to Cyprus. Berger served until 1999 and was replaced by Michael Dougall Bell. He backed Stéphane Dion at the 2006 Liberal Party of Canada leadership convention.

Electoral record (partial)

References

External links

1950 births
Living people
Businesspeople from Ottawa
Canadian Football League executives
Canadian sports businesspeople
Jewish Canadian politicians
Liberal Party of Canada MPs
McGill University Faculty of Law alumni
Members of the House of Commons of Canada from Quebec
Politicians from Ottawa
Sportspeople from Ottawa
University of Toronto alumni
Ambassadors of Canada to Israel
Montreal Alouettes team presidents